Xinqiao is a town of Changting County in mountainous western Fujian province, China. , it administered 20 villages.

See also 
 List of township-level divisions of Fujian

References 

Township-level divisions of Fujian